Charlie Capps may refer to:
 Charlie Capps (politician)
 Charlie Capps (rugby union)

See also
 Charles Capps, American Christian preacher and teacher